Nishimura Shigenaga ( – 23 July 1756) was a Japanese ukiyo-e artist.

Shigenaga was born  in Edo (modern Tokyo).  He worked as a landlord in Tōriabura-chō before moving to the Kanda district, where he ran a bookshop and taught himself art; he is not known to have had a teacher.  His work began to appear .  He worked in a variety of genres and formats.  His earlier work tended to be yakusha-e portraits of kabuki actors in the style of the Torii school; his later work is in an idiom more his own, incorporating the influence of Okumura Masanobu and Nishikawa Sukenobu.  Other genres he worked in include landscapes, kachō-e pictures of scenes of nature, and historical scenes.  He made a number of uki-e "floating pictures" incorporating geometric perspective.  The number of uki-e he produced was second only to Masanobu, who asserted himself the originator of the technique.

He produced some of the earliest ukiyo-e landscape prints; in 1727, his was the first set of prints of Lake Biwa. His work had a strong influence on later artists such as Suzuki Harunobu and Ishikawa Toyonobu, who may have been students of Shigenaga's; Toyonobu may have been Nishimura Shigenobu, Shigenaga's most prominent student.

References

Works cited

External links

18th-century Japanese artists
Ukiyo-e artists
Japanese landlords